Aleš Pikl (born 2 April 1975) is a Czech football player.

Pikl played for several Gambrinus liga clubs, including Baník Ostrava and FK Teplice. He is however associated mostly with FK Viktoria Žižkov, where he played over 100 league matches. In the 2002–03 season Pikl scored 11 goals, becoming the third best goalscorer of the season.

While playing for Chmel Blšany and Baník Ostrava, Pikl was a regular for the Czech Republic national U-21 football team. In 2002, he played his only match in the senior national team against Greece.

External links
 

Czech footballers
Czech Republic under-21 international footballers
Czech Republic international footballers
1975 births
Living people
Czech First League players
FC Baník Ostrava players
FK Viktoria Žižkov players
FC Fastav Zlín players
FK Baník Most players
FK Chmel Blšany players
FK Teplice players
Association football midfielders
SK Sparta Krč players
People from Roudnice nad Labem
1. FC Tatran Prešov players
Sportspeople from the Ústí nad Labem Region